Methia batesi is a species of beetle in the family Cerambycidae. It was described by Chemsak and Linsley in 1971.

References

Methiini
Beetles described in 1971